Kishan Pur  is a village in Phagwara Tehsil in Kapurthala district of Punjab State, India. The village is administrated by a Sarpanch who is an elected representative of village as per the constitution of India and Panchayati raj (India).

Transport 
Phagwara Junction Railway Station and Mauli Halt Railway Station are the nearby railway stations to Kishan Pur, while Jalandhar City Railway station is 23 km away from the village. The village is 118 km away from Sri Guru Ram Dass Jee International Airport in Amritsar and the other nearest airport is Sahnewal Airport in Ludhiana which is located 40 km away from the village. Phagwara , Jandiala, Jalandhar, Phillaur are the nearby cities to Kishan Pur village.

References

External links
  Villages in Kapurthala
 Kapurthala Villages List

Villages in Kapurthala district